Communauté de communes des Trois Rivières ("association of communes of the three rivers") may refer to the following associations in France:

Communauté de communes des Trois Rivières, Aisne 
Communauté de communes des Trois Rivières, Calvados 
Communauté de communes des Trois Rivières, Côtes-d'Armor 
Communauté de communes des Trois Rivières, Eure-et-Loir 
Communauté de communes des Trois Rivières, Marne 
Communauté de communes des Trois Rivières, Morbihan 
Communauté de communes des Trois Rivières, Seine-Maritime 
Communauté de communes des Trois Rivières, Vosges